Khug (also Romanized as Khūg; also known as Khūkī and Khūk) is a village in Nimbeluk Rural District, Nimbeluk District, Qaen County, South Khorasan Province, Iran. At the 2006 census, its population was 291, in 75 families.

References 

Populated places in Qaen County